Francis Carmichael Bruce (born December 29, 1837 in Peebleshire, Scotland-died July 9, 1928) was a politician and businessman. He was elected to the House of Commons of Canada in the 1900 election as a Member of the historical Conservative Party to represent the riding of Hamilton. He lost in the election of 1904 in the riding of Hamilton West. He also served as a councillor for the city of Hamilton, Ontario.

External links
 

1837 births
1928 deaths
Conservative Party of Canada (1867–1942) MPs
Members of the House of Commons of Canada from Ontario